Bobby Darin is the debut album by American singer Bobby Darin released in 1958. It includes Darin's first hit "Splish Splash".

Reception

Music critic Andrew Hamilton wrote in his Allmusic review on the 1994 CD reissue "Somebody tried to remake Darin into a young Dean Martin and failed. Only the most ardent Bobby Darin fans should consider purchasing this CD."

Track listing

Side one
"Splish Splash" (Bobby Darin, Murray "The K" Kaufman, Jean Murray) – 2:12
"Just in Case You Change Your Mind" (Melvin Bell, Harry Patterson, Deek Watson) – 2:07		
"Pretty Betty" (Darin, Don Kirshner) – 1:40		
"Talk to Me Something" (Darin, Don Kirshner) – 2:16		
"Judy, Don't Be Moody" (Ben Raleigh, Don Wolf) – 2:14		
"(Since You're Gone) I Can't Go On" (Doc Pomus, Mort Shuman) – 2:43

Side two
"I Found a Million Dollar Baby (in a Five and Ten Cent Store)" (Mort Dixon, Billy Rose, Harry Warren) – 2:00		
"Wear My Ring" (Darin, Don Kirshner) – 1:50		
"So Mean" (Darin, Don Kirshner) – 2:35
"Don't Call My Name" (Darin, Don Kirshner) – 1:58		
"Brand New House" (Darin, Woody Harris) – 2:30		
"Actions Speak Louder Than Words" (Berry Gordy, Jr., Roquel Davis) – 2:11

References 

Bobby Darin albums
1958 debut albums
Atco Records albums
Albums produced by Ahmet Ertegun